KRRG (98.1 FM) is a country music-formatted radio station that serves the Laredo, Texas, United States area.

KRRG broadcasts four HD radio subchannels HD1 is the analog signal, HD2 aires a Spanish variety format branded as NotiGAPE Music, HD3 aires a 1980s hits format branded as Energy 98 HD3, HD4 aires a Tejano format as Super Tejano 98.1 HD4.

External links
Big Buck 98.1
Guerra Communications Website

Country radio stations in the United States
RRG
Radio stations established in 1983